The Zimbabwe national cricket team toured India in the 1992–93 season to play a Test match and three One day internationals. This was Zimbabwe's inaugural tour of India, and Zimbabwe lost all four matches.

Only Test

Charms Cup ODI series

1st ODI

2nd ODI

3rd ODI

References

External links 
series home at Espncricinfo
tour schedule at cricketarchive

International cricket competitions from 1991–92 to 1994
1992-93
1992-93 India
India
1992-93 Zimbabwe
1993 in Indian cricket
March 1993 sports events in Asia